The Texas Hill Country AVA  is an American Viticultural Area located in the Texas Hill Country north of San Antonio and west of Austin, Texas. Established in 1991, it is the southernmost AVA. Today, there are around 80 wineries/vineyards. Despite the cultural influence of the local Texas German population, most of the grape varietals grown in the Texas Hill Country originate from France, Italy, or Spain rather than the cooler climate of Germany.

See also
 Texas wine

References

External links
  

American Viticultural Areas
.AVA
Texas wine
Regions of Texas
1991 establishments in Texas